Krishnapuram is a residential area situated in the City of Thrissur in the Kerala state of India. Krishnapuram is Ward 19 of Thrissur Municipal Corporation.

See also
Thrissur
Thrissur District
List of Thrissur Corporation wards

References

Suburbs of Thrissur city